{{Taxobox
| name = Mongoliimonas terrestris
| domain = Bacteria
| phylum = Pseudomonadota
| classis = Alphaproteobacteria
| ordo = Hyphomicrobiales
| familia = Pleomorphomonadaceae
| genus = Mongoliimonas  
| genus_authority = Xi et al. 2017<ref name="Poroshina">{{cite journal | authors = Xi J, Wang Y, Yang X, Tao Y, Shao Y, Feng F. | title = Mongoliimonas terrestris gen. nov., sp. nov., isolated from desert soil | journal = Int J Syst Evol Microbiol | year = 2017 | volume = 67 | issue = 8 | pages = 3010–3014| doi = 10.1099/ijsem.0.002067 | pmid = 28820127 }}</ref>
| species = M. terrestris| binomial = Mongoliimonas terrestris| binomial_authority = Xi et al. 2017
| synonyms = 
}}Mongoliimonas terrestris'' is a species of bacteria.

References

Hyphomicrobiales